Chrysocraspeda zearia is a species of moth of the family Geometridae first described by Charles Swinhoe in 1904. It is found on Madagascar.

References

External links
 With an image.

Sterrhinae
Moths described in 1904
Lepidoptera of Madagascar
Moths of Madagascar
Moths of Africa